Calisto Bassi (beginning of the 19th century, in Cremona – c. 1860, in Abbiategrasso) was an Italian opera librettist.

Bassi wrote many original librettos and was also active as translator into Italian of several librettos from other languages. For many years he was also stage director at La Scala in Milan.

Original librettos

Translations
This is a partial list of librettos translated into Italian by Bassi. Location and date refer to the first performance of the translated version.

 L'assedio di Corinto (from Le siège de Corinthe), music by Gioachino Rossini (Parma, Teatro Ducale, 31 January 1828)
 Guglielmo Tell (from Guillaume Tell), music by Gioachino Rossini (Lucca, Teatro del Giglio, 17 September 1831)
 La muta di Portici (from La muette de Portici), music by Daniel Auber (Rome, Teatro Valle, Spring 1835)
 Roberto il Diavolo (from Robert le diable), music by Giacomo Meyerbeer (Lisbon, 2 September 1838)
 Il Postiglione di Longjumeau (from Le postillon de Lonjumeau for Adolphe Adam)
 music by Pietro Antonio Coppola (Milan, Teatro alla Scala, 6 November 1838)
 music by A. A. Speranza (Turin, Teatro Sutera, Spring 1845)
 La figlia del reggimento (from La fille du régiment), music by Gaetano Donizetti (Milan, Teatro alla Scala, 30 October 1840)
 La Favorita (from La favorite), music by Gaetano Donizetti (Milan, Teatro alla Scala, 6 August 1843)
 I Martiri (from Les martyrs, adaptation of Poliuto), music by Gaetano Donizetti (Lisbon, 15 February 1843)
 Roberto Bruce (from Robert Bruce), music by Gioachino Rossini (1847)
 L'anima in pena (from L'âme en peine), music by Friedrich von Flotow (1847)
 Mosè (from Moïse et Pharaon), music by Gioachino Rossini (Naples, Teatro San Carlo, 1849)
 Gerusalemme (from Jérusalem), music by Giuseppe Verdi (Milan, Teatro alla Scala, 26 December 1850)
 I Guelfi ed i Ghibellini (from Les Huguenots) (Trieste, Teatro Grande, Carnival 1851)
 Il Profeta (from Le prophète), music by Giacomo Meyerbeer (Florence, Teatro della Pergola, 26 December 1852)
 Alessandro Stradella, music by Friedrich von Flotow (Genua, Teatro Carlo Felice, Autumn 1863)

Sources

External links

19th-century births
Year of birth unknown
1860 deaths
Italian opera librettists
Writers from Cremona
Italian translators
19th-century translators
Italian male dramatists and playwrights
19th-century Italian male writers